Hou Chong-wen (born 3 January 1954) is a Taiwanese politician. He was the Deputy Mayor of Chiayi City.

Early life
Hou did his bachelor's degree from Fu Jen Catholic University, master's and doctoral degree from Texas Christian University and Bowling Green State University in the United States respectively in sociology.

References

1954 births
Living people
Mayors of Chiayi
Fu Jen Catholic University alumni
Bowling Green State University alumni